The 2004 Queensland state election was held on 7 February 2004.

Retiring Members

Labor
 Steve Bredhauer MLA (Cook)
 Wendy Edmond MLA (Mount Coot-tha)
 Matt Foley MLA (Yeerongpilly)
 Anita Phillips MLA (Thuringowa)

National
 Vince Lester MLA (Keppel)

Liberal
 Joan Sheldon MLA (Caloundra)
 David Watson MLA (Moggill)

Legislative Assembly

Sitting members are shown in bold text. Successful candidates are highlighted in the relevant colour. Where there is possible confusion, an asterisk (*) is also used.

Unregistered parties and groups

The Socialist Alliance endorsed Coral Wynter in Brisbane Central, Adrian Skerritt in Inala and Lynda Hansen in South Brisbane.
Federal Independent member for Kennedy Bob Katter endorsed Jeff Knuth in Burdekin, Bruce Chalmers in Darling Downs, Andrew Lancini in Hinchinbrook, Sandra Hubert in Mundingburra and David Moyle in Thuringowa.

See also
 Members of the Queensland Legislative Assembly, 2001–2004
 Members of the Queensland Legislative Assembly, 2004–2006
 2004 Queensland state election

References
ABC Elections

Candidates for Queensland state elections